Pochinkovsky District is the name of several administrative and municipal districts in Russia:
Pochinkovsky District, Nizhny Novgorod Oblast, an administrative and municipal district of Nizhny Novgorod Oblast
Pochinkovsky District, Smolensk Oblast, an administrative and municipal district of Smolensk Oblast

References